Purina Mills, LLC is the farm animal feeds unit of Land O' Lakes. It was previously part of Ralston Purina, until the U.S. animal feeds portion was first sold in 1986.

History 
Purina traces its roots back to 1894, when founder William H. Danforth began producing feed for various farm animals under the name Purina Mills. The predominant brand for each animal was generally referred to as "Chow"; hence there was "Purina Horse Chow", "Purina Dog Chow", "Purina Cat Chow", "Purina Rabbit Chow", "Purina Pig Chow", and even "Purina Monkey Chow". Later, in 1902, he merged with university professor Webster Edgerly, founder of Ralstonism, who was at the time producing breakfast cereals, to form the "Ralston Purina Company".

Ralston Purina sold Purina Mills, the U.S. animal feed business, to British Petroleum in 1986, while retaining the pet food and international animal feed businesses. In 1993, the Sterling Group of Houston led a leveraged buyout of Purina Mills. In 1998, it was purchased by Koch Industries, but a U.S. bankruptcy court cancelled out all equity held by Koch to maintain the company's viability. Purina Mills was purchased by Land O'Lakes in 2001.

Licensing rights
Purina Mills licenses the Purina and Chow brands for the United States and its territories (including Puerto Rico) from the successor of the Ralston Purina Company and owner of the trademarks, Nestlé Purina PetCare.

Outside of the U.S., the rights to the Purina and Chow brands for animal feeds are licensed to Cargill by Nestle Purina PetCare.

Logo

Ralston Purina was famed for its "checkerboard" trademark. The inspiration for the Ralston Purina logo came from a family from founder William Danforth's childhood who dressed in checkerboard cloth.
The checkerboard trademark, intended to make their burlap bags of feed stand out from competitors, was introduced in 1904. Ralston Purina’s headquarters was called Checkerboard Square. At one point, Ralston Purina owned an interest in the St. Louis Blues National Hockey League team; during this period, the arena they then used was referred to as the "Checkerdome".

The checkerboard logo then evolved into a personal development concept Danforth put forth in his book I Dare You, in which he proposed that four key components in life ("Physical," "Mental," "Social," and "Religious") need to be in balance, and one area was not to develop at expense of the other. The concept became intertwined with the company in 1921, when it began selling feed that was pressed in cubes called "checkers".

References

External links 
 Official Purina Mills website

1894 establishments in Missouri
American companies established in 1894
Animal food manufacturers
Food and drink companies established in 1894
Ralston Purina
Former BP subsidiaries